Heinlein or Henlein is a German surname. Notable people with the surname include:

 Karl Heinlein (1892–1960), Austrian footballer
 Klaus Heinlein (born 1953), German former footballer
 Konrad Henlein (1898–1945), Nazi German politician
 Martina Heinlein (born 1981), a field hockey player in the 2008 Summer Olympics
 Max Hussarek von Heinlein (1865–1935), Austrian politician, Prime Minister of Austria in 1918
 Peter Henlein (1479/80–1542), German locksmith and watchmaker, often considered the inventor of the portable timepiece
 Robert A. Heinlein (1907–1988), American science fiction writer
 Virginia Heinlein (1916–2003), third wife of Robert A. Heinlein

German-language surnames
Surnames from given names
de:Henlein